Furka DFB railway station is a metre gauge railway station at the eastern portal of the Furka Summit Tunnel, in the Canton of Uri, Switzerland.  The station was opened in 1926.  It was then owned and operated from that point until 1981 by the Furka Oberalp Bahn (FO), which connects Brig in Valais, via Andermatt in Uri, with Göschenen, Uri, and Disentis/Mustér, Graubünden.

In 1982, the original portion of the FO between Oberwald in Valais and Realp in Uri, including the Furka railway station, was replaced by an FO line passing through the then new Furka Base Tunnel.  The superseded portion of the FO line was abandoned.

Since , the abandoned portion of the FO line has been progressively reopened from Realp, as a heritage railway operated by the Furka Steam Railway (DFB).  On , the DFB was extended from its then temporary terminus at Tiefenbach to Furka via the Steinstafel Viaduct, and the station at Furka was reopened.  The station building, reconstructed for the reopening, houses a small restaurant, public conveniences, and a modern block system to control safeworking in the Summit Tunnel.

On , the DFB was extended further, from Furka to Gletsch, via the Furka Summit Tunnel.

Furka is the summit of the DFB line, as well as the highest railway station in the canton of Uri.  As a general rule, DFB steam locomotives travel downhill with the driving cab facing in the direction of travel, to optimise water levels in the locomotives' boilers.  A DFB steam locomotive operating a train between Realp and Gletsch therefore usually needs to be turned on Furka's restored turntable, in preparation for its descent.

See also

Tiefenbach halting point, Switzerland
Furka Summit Tunnel
Furka Base Tunnel
Furka Oberalp Bahn
Furka Steam Railway
List of highest railway stations in Switzerland

References

External links
 Furka Steam Railway 
 Matterhorn Gotthard Bahn
 Official timetable of Switzerland

Railway stations in the canton of Uri
Railway stations in Switzerland opened in 1926